Costa del Sol Airport,  is an airport serving communities on the west shore of Rapel Lake in the O'Higgins Region of Chile.

There is rising terrain north through east.

See also

Transport in Chile
List of airports in Chile

References

External links
OpenStreetMap - Costa del Sol
OurAirports - Costa del Sol
FallingRain - Costa del Sol Airport

Airports in O'Higgins Region